In enzymology, a dimethylmalate dehydrogenase is an enzyme that catalyzes the chemical reaction

(R)-3,3-dimethylmalate + NAD+  3-methyl-2-oxobutanoate + CO2 + NADH

Thus, the two substrates of this enzyme are (R)-3,3-dimethylmalate and NAD+, whereas its 3 products are 3-methyl-2-oxobutanoate, CO2, and NADH.

This enzyme belongs to the family of oxidoreductases, specifically those acting on the CH-OH group of donor with NAD+ or NADP+ as acceptor.  The systematic name of this enzyme class is (R)-3,3-dimethylmalate:NAD+ oxidoreductase (decarboxylating). This enzyme is also called beta,beta-dimethylmalate dehydrogenase.  This enzyme participates in pantothenate and coa biosynthesis.  It has 5 cofactors: ammonia, manganese, cobalt, potassium,  and NH4+.

References

 

EC 1.1.1
NADH-dependent enzymes
Manganese enzymes
Cobalt enzymes
Potassium enzymes
Enzymes of unknown structure